Lloyd Stephens Bryce (September 20, 1851 – April 2, 1917) was an American diplomat and politician who served one term as a U.S. Representative from New York from 1887 to 1889. He was also a prominent magazine editor.

Early life
Lloyd Bryce was born in Flushing, New York on September 20, 1851.  His father, Joseph Smith Bryce (1808–1901), graduated third in his class from the United States Military Academy in 1829, Robert E. Lee was second, and served as a Union Army Major in the Civil War, engaged in the defense of Washington, D.C.  Lloyd's sister was Clemence Smith Bryce, who married Nicholas Fish, the U.S. Ambassador to Switzerland and Belgium, and was the mother of Hamilton Fish II.  He was a nephew of John L. Stevens, U.S. Minister to the Kingdom of Hawaii.

He attended Georgetown University, Washington, D.C., and Christ Church, Oxford, where he graduated with bachelor's and master's degrees. Bryce also studied at Columbia Law School.

Career
Bryce was an avid sports enthusiast, and wrote that sports were capable both of quelling revolutionary thought among the poor and promoting understanding between nations.  He was a frequent participant in polo matches in Newport, Rhode Island and Manhattan and fox hunts on Long Island.

Political career
Bryce, a Democrat, became interested in politics.  In 1886, Governor David B. Hill appointed him to the governor's staff as Paymaster General of the militia with the rank of Brigadier General, a largely ceremonial position.  Afterwards he was known as General Bryce.

Bryce was elected as a Democrat to the Fiftieth Congress, serving from March 4, 1887 to March 3, 1889. He was an unsuccessful candidate for reelection in 1888 to the Fifty-first Congress.

He was appointed Minister to the Netherlands on August 12, 1911, and he served until September 10, 1913.

Writer and editor
His friend C. Allen Thorndike Rice, the editor and owner of the North American Review, died unexpectedly in 1889 and left the magazine to Bryce in his will. Bryce was the owner and editor from 1889 to 1896.

Influenced by his experience in Congress he wrote an early "Yellow Peril" story, called Dream of Conquest for the June 1889 issue of Lippincott's Monthly Magazine.  His other published works include: Paradise: A Novel (1888); Romance of an Alter Ego (1889); Friends in Exile (1893); and Lady Blanche's Salon (1899).

Family
In 1879, he married Edith Cooper (1854–1916), the only child of New York City Mayor Edward Cooper, and granddaughter of the famous industrialist Peter Cooper.  Together, they were the parents of:

 Edith Claire Bryce (1880–1960), who married President of the New York Public Service Commission John Sergeant Cram (1851–1936)
 Cornelia Elizabeth Bryce (1881–1960), who married conservationist Gifford Pinchot (1865–1946), the first Chief of the United States Forest Service under Theodore Roosevelt, in 1914.
 Peter Cooper Bryce (1889–1964), who married Angelica Schuyler Brown (1890–1980), of the Brown banking family, in 1917.

Bryce died in Mineola, New York, April 2, 1917, and was interred in Greenwood Cemetery, Brooklyn, New York.  The bulk of his estate, worth $1,665,061, was left to his two daughters, with his son receiving all his paintings, including a portrait by Godfrey Kneller, books, engravings, and clothing. His home at 1025 Fifth Avenue was left to his children in four equal shares, two to his son and one to each of his daughters.

Descendants
His grandson, Henry Sergeant Cram (1907–1997), married Edith Kingdon Drexel (1911–1934), the granddaughter of Anthony Joseph Drexel, Jr. and George Jay Gould I, in 1930. Cram later married Ruth Vaux, a granddaughter of Richard Vaux, after his first wife's death.  His granddaughter, Edith Bryce Cram (1908–1972), married Arthur Gerhard in 1950.

References

External links

 
James Terry White, The National Cyclopaedia of American Biography, Volume 1, 1898, page 252

1851 births
1917 deaths
People from Flushing, Queens
People from Mineola, New York
Georgetown University alumni
Alumni of Christ Church, Oxford
Columbia Law School alumni
American male writers
American militia generals
Burials at Green-Wood Cemetery
Ambassadors of the United States to the Netherlands
Ambassadors of the United States to Luxembourg
Democratic Party members of the United States House of Representatives from New York (state)
19th-century American politicians
People included in New York Society's Four Hundred
20th-century American diplomats